Arthur Hugh Fabling (6 September 1889 – 13 October 1972) was an English cricketer.  Fabling was a right-handed batsman who occasionally fielded as a wicket-keeper.  He was born at Grandborough, Warwickshire.

Fabling made a single first-class appearance for Warwickshire against Northamptonshire at the County Ground, Northampton, in the 1921 County Championship.  Fabling was dismissed for a single run in Warwickshire's first-innings of 243 by William Wells, with Northamptonshire replying by making just 77 in their first-innings.  Warwickshire made 268 in their second-innings, with Fabling being dismissed again by Wells, this time for 7 runs.  Northamptonshire were set a victory target of 435 to win, but could only manage to make 266 all out, giving Warwickshire a 168 runs victory.  This was his only major appearance for Warwickshire.  He also played association football for Northampton.

He died at the village of his birth on 13 October 1972.

References

External links
Arthur Fabling at ESPNcricinfo
Arthur Fabling at CricketArchive

1889 births
1972 deaths
People from the Borough of Rugby
English cricketers
Warwickshire cricketers